Sanaz  (also Sanaaz,  sânâz) is a Persian name. The name was borrowed into Turkish as a female given name. In Persian it is composed of sa meaning "likeness" and naz meaning "delicate". Sanaz then means "unique and delicate". The composition is similar to that of many other combined Persian female names, such as Elnaz, Golnaz, Parinaz, Sarvenaz.

In Turkey and among the Turkmen, Sanaz is composed of San and az, meaning "likeness" and "few" respectively, thus 'unique'. It is used in other Turkic-speaking countries in Central Asia.

The usage of this name as a first name is more common than as a middle name, especially among Americans, Turks and Persians.

Notable people with this name
 Sanaz Abazarnejad, Iranian footballer
 Sanaz Marand (born 1988), American tennis player
 Sanaz Mazinani (born 1978), Iranian-Canadian photographer and curator
 Sanaz Minaie, Iranian chef

References 

Turkish feminine given names